This is a list of players that have played for the Argentina national football team. The players are listed in chronological order according to the date of their debut. Additionally, their dates of birth, number of caps and goals are stated.

As of match played 28 June 2021

References

 
Argentina
Association football player non-biographical articles